WPZ is an initialism or acronym and may refer to:

Taronga Western Plains Zoo in Dubbo, New South Wales, Australia
Woodland Park Zoo in Seattle, Washington, United States
Washington Park Zoo, a previous name of the Oregon Zoo in Portland, Oregon, United States
The Washington Park and Zoo Railway, still the name of the above zoo's railway
 Water Protection Zone